The Keith style of playing the 5-string banjo emphasizes the melody of the song.  Also known as the "Melodic" or "Chromatic style", it was first developed and popularized independently by Bobby Thompson and Bill Keith in the early 1960s.  It is used primarily by bluegrass banjoists, though it can be applied to virtually any genre.  Most banjoists who play Keith style do not use it exclusively, but integrate it as one aspect of their playing, a way of adding spice to the more common 3-finger style of  Earl Scruggs.

The Keith style is a fingerpicking style played with picks on the thumb, index and middle fingers.  It centers on playing scales in a linear fashion.  This contrasts with "3-Finger" or Scruggs style, which is centered on arpeggios, or chord tones played in rapid succession.  Generally speaking, in the Keith style the fingers of the picking hand alternate between strings, rarely picking the same string twice.  Frequently open strings are alternated with strings that are fretted halfway up the neck or more.  These aspects contrast with "Single String" or Reno style, which also emphasizes linear (playing the same string multiple times) playing.  In Reno style, however, scales are played out of closed-chord positions, where the entire scale may be played without moving the fretting hand up or down the neck, by moving from the lowest to highest string in a linear fashion.  In the Reno style, the index finger and thumb generally alternate while picking, and often pick the same string two or more times in succession.  One aspect of Keith style which makes it difficult to learn is that one often moves to a higher note in the scale by picking a lower string, albeit fretted to give the higher note.

A distinct advantage of melodic style is the ease of playing fiddle tunes using the melody verbatim while maintaining a right hand technique in line with Scruggs-style. Accomplishing the same goal in single string style often requires a different right hand approach. While at times the thumb may be used in a manner inconsistent with a banjo roll-based style, the "cascading" effect of the roll is still present in many examples of melodic style playing (especially with the bombastic descending runs, popular in the 1970s).

The earliest recordings of the melodic style were made by Bobby Thompson in the late 1950s when he was in Jim and Jesse's band.  The style came to prominence when Bill Keith joined Bill Monroe's Bluegrass Boys in 1963.  He impressed audiences with his ability to play fiddle tunes note-for-note on the banjo.  Other early proponents were Marshall Brickman and Eric Weissberg.  During the 1960s and '70s, the style steadily gained popularity among progressive bluegrass banjoists like Alan Munde, Tony Trischka, Courtney Johnson, Ben Eldridge and Gordon Stone.  However, the style remains somewhat controversial among strict traditionalists.

Tony Trischka has written several instructional books that discuss the Keith Style:  Hot Licks For Bluegrass Banjo, Teach Yourself Bluegrass Banjo, and especially Melodic Banjo.  The latter has interviews with many prominent Keith style banjoists, including Bill Keith and Bobby Thompson.  Ken Perlman has helped to popularize the style in clawhammer banjo playing.

Musical performance techniques
Bluegrass music